Bradford Central was a parliamentary constituency in the city of Bradford, West Yorkshire, which returned one Member of Parliament (MP) to the House of Commons of the Parliament of the United Kingdom. Elections were held under the first-past-the-post voting system.

The constituency was created for the 1885 general election, when the Redistribution of Seats Act split the two-member Bradford constituency into three single-seat divisions. It was abolished for the 1955 general election.

Political history 
For most of its existence, Bradford Central was a marginal seat, initially between the Liberal Party and the Conservatives or their Liberal Unionist allies. The Liberals held it for all but eleven of the years from 1885 to 1918, after which it became a Labour-Conservative marginal. Control alternated between Labour and the Conservatives through the 1920s and 1930s, and in 1945 it became a safe seat for Labour.

Boundaries
1885–1918: The Municipal Borough of Bradford wards of Exchange, Lister Hills, Little Horton, North, and West.

1918–1950: The County Borough of Bradford wards of East, Exchange, Manningham, North, South, and West.

1950–1955: The County Borough of Bradford wards of Bradford Moor, Exchange, Manningham, North East, and South.

Members of Parliament

Elections

References 

 British Parliamentary Election Results 1885-1918, compiled and edited by F.W.S. Craig (The Macmillan Press 1974)

Parliamentary constituencies in Yorkshire and the Humber (historic)
Constituencies of the Parliament of the United Kingdom established in 1885
Constituencies of the Parliament of the United Kingdom disestablished in 1955
Politics of Bradford